Pyomyositis is a bacterial infection of the skeletal muscles which results in an abscess. Pyomyositis is most common in tropical areas but can also occur in temperate zones.

Pyomyositis can be classified as primary or secondary. Primary pyomyositis is a skeletal muscle infection arising from hematogenous infection, whereas secondary pyomyositis arises from localized penetrating trauma or contiguous spread to the muscle.

Diagnosis
Diagnosis is done via the following manner:
 Pus discharge culture and sensitivity
 X ray of the part to rule out osteomyelitis
 Creatinine phosphokinase (more than 50,000 units)
 MRI is useful
 Ultrasound guided aspiration

Treatment
The abscesses within the muscle must be drained surgically (not all patient require surgery if there is no abscess). Antibiotics are given for a minimum of three weeks to clear the infection.

Epidemiology
Pyomyositis is most often caused by the bacterium Staphylococcus aureus. The infection can affect any skeletal muscle, but most often infects the large muscle groups such as the quadriceps or gluteal muscles.

Pyomyositis is mainly a disease of children and was first described by Scriba in 1885. Most patients are aged 2 to 5 years, but infection may occur in any age group. Infection often follows minor trauma and is more common in the tropics, where it accounts for 4% of all hospital admissions. In temperate countries such as the US, pyomyositis was a rare condition (accounting for 1 in 3000 pediatric admissions), but has become more common since the appearance of the USA300 strain of MRSA.

Gonococcal pyomyositis is a rare infection caused by Neisseria gonorrhoeae.

Additional images

References 

Maravelas R, Melgar TA, Vos D, Lima N, Sadarangani S (2020). "Pyomyositis in the United States 2002-2014". J Infect. 80(5):497-503. doi:10.1016/j.jinf.2020.02.005. .

External links 

Bacterial diseases
Bacterium-related cutaneous conditions
Muscular disorders
Inflammations